The Pell Street Mystery is a 1924 American silent action film directed by Joseph Franz and starring George Larkin, Frank Whitson, and Ollie Kirby. It is part of a series of films featuring Larkin as a New York City newspaper reporter.

Plot
As described in a film magazine, the police find Queenie Ross murdered. Tip O’Neil, a newspaper reporter, is detailed to solve the mystery. He finds a cuff link on the body and recollects returning a similar one to Count Verdaux, a gang leader. Dressed as a tango dancer, he gives an exhibition with Mazie, the Count's sweetheart. The gang is wise to Tip and goes for him. The lights go out and Tip escapes. He learns his sweetheart turned off the lights. Nell is brought to Ah Foo's rooms by a trick. Tip learns of her captivity goes to get her and a fight follows. The police arrive and the murderer confesses. Tip gets another scoop for his newspaper.

Cast
 George Larkin as Tip O’Neil
 Frank Whitson
 Ollie Kirby as Mazie Barnett
 Jack Richardson as Count Verdaux
 Karl Silvera

References

Bibliography
 Langman, Larry. The Media in the Movies: A Catalog of American Journalism Films, 1900-1996. McFarland & Company, 1998.

External links

1924 films
1920s action films
American action films
Films directed by Joseph Franz
American silent feature films
Rayart Pictures films
American black-and-white films
1920s English-language films
1920s American films
Silent action films